SN 441011, until 2019 SEV 1011, is the Swiss national standard for AC power plug for domestic use and similar purposes. The plug SN 441011 Type 12 and the socket SN 441011 Type 13 are also known internationally as Type J.

Details

The plug-in system defined in the standard for 250 V / 440 V alternating voltage at 50 Hz is structured to be “hierarchically downward compatible”. This means that sockets designed for 16 amps also accept plugs for 10 amps, but not the other way around, and that 2- or 3-pole (single-phase) plugs can also be used with 5-pole (three-phase) sockets. The Euro plug (2.5 A) also fits into all 4 socket types.

In all versions with three or five contact pins (Types 12/13, 15, 23 and 25) the middle pole is the protective contact. Although the contact pins are of the same length, the protective contact is in advance because the sockets for the neutral conductor and phase conductor(s) are sunk deeper in the socket. The offset arrangement of the contacts ensures reverse polarity protection (with a socket, the phase conductor is on the right and the protective conductor is at the bottom). All new sockets are equipped with protective collars. Sockets without protective collars were allowed outside of wet rooms until 2016, but existing sockets of this type can continue to be operated.

History

The Swiss standard was first described in SEV 1011 (ASE1011/1959 SW10A-R). On 4 December 2009, the TK23 Technical Committee issued the new revised edition of the Swiss standard SEV 1011:2009 for 10-A plugs and 11/12 sockets to provide, among other things, improved protection against contact with partially insulated pins can. As of 1 January 2013, imports into Switzerland of Type 11 and Type 12 plugs are only permitted with partially insulated plug pins. After the year 2016, only sockets type 13 with a recessed socket hole may be brought onto the market.

From the Type 12 proposed in 1937 and introduced in 1953, the international standard IEC 60906-1 was derived in 1986, on which only the national standards of Brazil (NBR 14136 or Type N) and South Africa (SANS 164-2) are based. Despite the great similarity, these are not compatible with SN 441011, as the polarity has been reversed in IEC 60906-1 and the earthing contact is only 3 mm offset from the center line instead of 5 mm. (A combined socket, which accepts both plugs according to SN 441011 and IEC 60906-1, would, however, be easy to implement, since a further hole for the earthing contact with the smaller distance would only have to be added opposite the previous central hole.) The hexagonal shape of the Euro plug (2.5 A) is also derived from the Swiss standard. This differs only slightly from the connector Type 11 (10 A).

Types

Standard documents 
The Swiss standard is described in SN 441011 "Plugs and sockets for household use and similar purposes", which contains the following standard sheets:

 SN 441011-1: Description of the systems with risk analysis and national deviations from the IEC 60884 series
 SN 441011-2-1: Standard sheets and construction specifications for plug-in devices with degrees of protection IP20 and IP55
 SN 441011-2-2: Multiple and intermediate adapters, extension cables, socket strips as well as travel and fixed adapters
 SN 441011-2-3: Advices

Products according to the outdated standard SEV 1011:2009 may only be manufactured or imported until February 28, 2022.

Until 2019, SEV 1011:2009 (ASE1011 / 1959 SW10A-R) was the relevant standard.

On December 4, 2009, the technical committee TK23 published the new, revised edition of the then standard SEV 1011:2009 for 10 A plugs and sockets of type 11/12 in order to offer, among other things, improved protection against contact with partially insulated connector pins can.

From January 1, 2013, the import of Type 11 and Type 12 plugs into Switzerland will only be permitted with partially insulated pins. After 2016, only Type 13 sockets with a recessed socket hole may be brought onto the market.

Dimensions 
 Dimensions of the protective collar for sockets Collars of sockets according to T11 and T21 are at least 16 mm (+1 mm) wide, those according to T13 and T23 at least 21 mm (+2 mm) wide. All collars of these types are at least 36.5 mm long. The respective angles are 45 degrees. Those of three-phase sockets have a dimension of 37.2 (± 0.7) × 39.5 (± 1) mm.
 Protective collar depth for sockets With single-phase sockets (T11, T13, T21, T23) the protective collar is 13 mm (+5 mm) deep, with three-phase sockets 17.5 mm (+1 mm) deep.
 Dimensions of the connector Plugs according to T11 and T21 are between 13 mm and 14.5 mm wide, those according to T13 and T23 between 14.5 mm and 20 mm wide. Connector according to T1 and T13 between 35 mm and 36 mm long. The respective angles are 45 degrees. Three-phase plugs have a dimension of 35.4 (± 0.7) × 30 (± 0.7) mm.
 Pin length of the connector The pins are 19 mm (± 0.5 mm) long on all types. The length of the insulation on the connector pins is 8 mm (± 0.25 mm).
 Diameter of the pins and the openings The pins of the 10 A connector are 4 mm (± 0.06 mm) in diameter. The diameter of the openings in the sockets is 4.5 mm (+0.2 mm). The pins of the 16 A plugs are 4 (± 0.06) x 5 (± 0.06) mm wide, the corresponding openings are 4.5 (+0.2) x 5.5 (+0.2) mm wide.
 Distance between conductors In both the 10 A and 16 A versions, the distance between the phase conductor and the neutral conductor is 19 mm (± 0.15 mm). The protective conductor is offset by 5 mm (± 0.1 mm). In the three-phase plugs and sockets (T15 and T25), L2 and L3 are offset by 8 mm (± 0.1 mm) from the protective conductor, i.e. the distance between L1 and L2 or between N and L3 is 13 mm.

Development

Origins 
The 10 A series has been gradually standardized:
T12 in 1937,
T11 in 1952,
T13 in 1953,
T15 in 1979.
Then the 16 A variant (types 21, 23, 25) was introduced in 1997.

Elimination of historical safety issues with types 11, 12 and 13 

Originally, T12 plugs and sockets (the most common in domestic use) posed a safety concern. As the T12 sockets are flat and as the pins of the plugs did not have any insulation, the electrical contact was established in the pins even though the latter remained accessible, not fully inserted.

T13 sockets do not present this risk because they are recessed. When the electrical contact is made, the pins are fully within the recess and are therefore not accessible. T13 sockets were required in wet spaces (bathrooms, kitchens, etc.) and in many workplace environments.

The 2009 revision of the SEV 1011 standard therefore introduced two measures:

 Eliminated T12 sockets (sale and installation prohibited after December 31, 2016) and instead mandates T13 sockets in all cases.
 Requires partially insulated pins on T12 and T11 plugs, similar to Europlug. Plugs with uninsulated pins were prohibited for import and production after December 31, 2012, and for sale after December 31, 2016.

Measure 1 alone ensures electrical safety in new installations, but it does not improve the safety of existing installations. However, electrical outlets often remain in place for decades. Measure 2 then makes it possible to improve safety when using existing T12 sockets: when electrical contact is made in a partially insulated pin, the conductive part is no longer accessible, even with a non-recessed socket. Since electrical appliances are replaced comparatively often (more often than sockets), the situation should improve overall in a few years.

See also
 Europlug
 AC power plugs and sockets
 IEC 60906-1 derived from SN 441011 Type 12/13

References 

Mains power connectors
Standards of Switzerland